Rongomaipapa Amy Ahomiro (born ) is a professional volleyball player from New Zealand.

Personal life
Ahomiro was born in Tauranga, New Zealand on 1 May 1992, she was a high school graduate of Brent International School in Manila, Philippines where she moved with her family when she was 14, and graduated from the Ateneo de Manila University in 2015 after finishing an AB Communication course.

Career
She played the sport of volleyball in the Philippines, as a member of the Ateneo de Manila University women's varsity volleyball team, the Ateneo Lady Eagles. Her stint with the Ateneo Lady Eagles was very fruitful. She won the Finals Most Valuable Player award and her team the Ateneo Lady Eagles won the title of the UAAP Season 77 (2014-15) women's volleyball tournament.
She joined the club BaliPure Purest Water Defenders for the 2016 Shakey's V-League 13th Season Open Conference wherein they finish in 3rd place beating the team of Laoag Power Smashers for the bronze medal.
After her stint with the Balipure Purest Water Defenders, she then joined the club team of Perlas Spikers for the 14th Season of Premier Volleyball League wherein they were about to play for the semi-finals but the rules was change and the 4 bottom teams will have a play-offs for the 3rd and 4th spot but they failed to make it to the cut.

Awards

Individuals
 2014–15 UAAP Season 77 "Finals Most Valuable Player"

References

1992 births
Living people
University Athletic Association of the Philippines volleyball players
New Zealand women's volleyball players
Sportspeople from Tauranga
Ateneo de Manila University alumni
Middle blockers
Opposite hitters
21st-century New Zealand women